This is a list of college athletics programs in the U.S. state of Illinois.

NCAA

Division I

Division II

Division III

NAIA

NJCAA

NCCAA

Other/None

See also 
List of NCAA Division I institutions
List of NCAA Division II institutions
List of NCAA Division III institutions
List of NAIA institutions
List of NCCAA institutions
List of USCAA institutions

Illinois
College athletic programs

College athletic programs